Zhiping is a town under the administration of Jingning County, Gansu, China. , it administers the following twelve villages:
Hougou Village
Liuhe Village
Dazhuang Village
Leigou Village
Zhupu Village
Anning Village
Wuping Village
Liugou Village
Chenxia Village
Mahe Village
Yangdian Village
Yinpo Village

References 

Township-level divisions of Gansu
Jingning County, Gansu